Mygdonia was an ancient territory, part of Ancient Thrace, later conquered by Macedon, which comprised the plains around Therma (Thessalonica) together with the valleys of Klisali and Besikia, including the area of the Axios river mouth and extending as far east as Lake Bolbe. To the north it was joined by Crestonia. The Echeidorus, which flowed into the Thermaic Gulf near the marshes of the Axios, had its sources in Crestonia. The pass of Aulon or Arethusa was probably the boundary of Mygdonia towards Bisaltia. The maritime part of Mygdonia formed a district called Amphaxitis, a distinction which first occurs in Polybius, who divides all the great plain at the head of the Thermaic gulf into Amphaxitis and Bottiaea, and which is found three centuries later in Ptolemy. The latter introduces Amphaxitis twice under the subdivisions of Macedonia (in one instance placing the mouths of the Echidorus and Axios in Amphaxitis, and mentioning Thessalonica as the only town in the district, which agrees with Polybius and with Strabo). In another place Ptolemy includes Stageira and Arethusa in Amphaxitis, which, if correct, would indicate that a portion of Amphaxitis, very distant from the Axios, was separated from the remainder by a part of Mygdonia; but since this is improbable, the word is perhaps an error of the text.

The main cities of Mygdonia were Therma (Thessalonica), Sindus, Chalastra, Altus, Strepsa, Cissus, Mellisurgis (today, Mellisourgós), and Heracleustes. According to the Acts of the Apostles, the town of Apollonia was visited by the apostles Paul and Silas. Besides these, the following obscure towns occur in Ptolemy: Chaetae, Moryllus, Antigoneia (which actually refers to Antigonia Psaphara in the Chalcidice), Calindaea, Boerus, Physca, Trepilus, Carabia, Xylopolis, Assorus, Lete, Phileres, Dicaea, Aeneia and Arethusa .

The area has been inhabited since the Mesolithic era  (9000-7000 BC). Early inhabitants probably were the Pelasgians, followed by the Mygdones, who gave their name to the region. The Mygdones may have been a Brigian or Thracian tribe. Paeonians and also Thracians (in particular, the Edonians) ruled and inhabited the region for a time, until it was annexed to Macedon. Today, most of Mygdonia is comprehended within the Thessaloniki regional unit , in Greece.

See also
 Lower Macedonia
 modern Mygdonia, Thessaloniki
Macedon
Macedonia (Greece)
Chalcidice
Thrace

References

Smith, William (editor); Dictionary of Greek and Roman Geography Vol 2; (1854), Pag. 384

 
Ancient Greek geography
Geography of ancient Macedonia
Geography of ancient Thrace
Thracian tribes
Historical regions in Greece